Richard Bull may refer to:

 Richard Bull (actor) (1924–2014), American actor
 Richard Bull (aviator) (1914–1942), U.S. naval officer
 Richard S. Bull (1913–1942), U.S. naval officer, also an aviator
 Richard Bull (Australian politician) (born 1946), New South Wales politician
 Richard Bull (MP) (1721–1805), British politician